King City Union Elementary School District is a public school district based in Monterey County, California, United States.

References

External links
 

School districts in Monterey County, California